The French brig Griffon, was a Pallinure-class brig launched in 1806. After HMS Bacchante captured Griffon in 1808, the Royal Navy took her into service. Griffon participated in one action that resulted in her crew being awarded the Naval General Service Medal. Two of her officers were subject to notable courts martial, one for murder and one for smuggling, with the murderer being hanged and the smuggler dismissed the Navy. The Navy sold Griffon in 1819 to Hills & Co., who proceeded to use her as a London-based whaler. She sailed to the South Seas fishery under some under different masters. Hill & Co. then sold her to Wilson & Co. who employed her on one last whaling voyage that ended in 1850.

French career
From 17 March to 4 November 1806, Griffon, under the command of lieutenant de vaisseau Jacques Gautier, was at Rochefort and the Bay of Aiguillon. Then she served in the roads of the Ile d'Aix between March and August 1807. Finally, in early 1808 she carried troops from Rochefort to Martinique.

On the way Griffon encountered one or more British frigates. The frigate may have been , and according to the same report, Griffon was in company with the French brigs Palinure and Pilade. On 17 March Griffon took refuge at Marin, Martinique. Palinure and Pilade sailed on to the roads at Trinité.

They succeeded in capturing a battery but Griffons fire drove them back empty handed, and with heavy casualties. Later, Griffon  continued on to Fort-de-France.

Capture

On 11 May 1808 Bacchante captured Griffon off Cape Antonio. Bacchante pursued Griffon for almost seven hours, and fought her for a half an hour. Griffon only struck when she found herself crowded some 100 metres from the breakers with Bacchante only some 200 meters from her. Griffon was still under Gautier's command. In the engagement Griffon had five men wounded, while Bacchante suffered no casualties.

Griffon, of 16 guns and 120 men, had sailed from Rochefort to Martinique, and was returning to France via Pensacola. Bacchante sent her into Jamaica.

Royal Navy career
The Navy commissioned Griffon at Jamaica under Lieutenant Henry Spark Jones. Lieutenant Allen, or Lieutenant T.P.J. Parry, replaced him in December 1808.

Griffon was among the vessels that carried out the blockade of the city of Santo Domingo that accompanied the siege, and was present on 6 July 1809 at its surrender. Griffons captain at Santo Domingo was Lieutenant J. Gore (acting).

Griffon arrived at Sheerness on 10 October 1809. She then underwent fitting at Chatham between February 1810 and December 1811. Commander John Tannock recommissioned her in November 1811, but handed over command to Commander George Trollope in February 1812.

On 27 March, near Dieppe, Griffon and  intercepted a 13-strong flotilla heading there from Boulogne-sur-Mer. The two British vessels engaged them closely, capturing three brigs (praams Nos. 95, 246, and 314), and driving two more onto the shore. Each French brig was armed with three 24-pounder guns and an 8" howitzer. The British casualties amounted to one officer and four men wounded. The British sent their prizes into Plymouth.

In 1847 the Admiralty awarded the Naval General Service Medal with clasps "Griffon 27 March 1812" and "Rosario 27 March 1812" to the five  surviving claimants from Griffon and the seven from Rosario.

Lieutenant Richard Steward Gamage joined Griffon in July as her first lieutenant. On 10 September the Milford, Mann, master, put into Ramsgate. She had been sailing from Chepstow to Deptford when she ran foul of Griffin and lost her foremast and suffered other damage.

On 20 October Griffon was in the Downs and Gamage was in command, Trollope having gone ashore. Gamage was a mild man who, in a sudden and uncharacteristic fit of rage, stabbed an insubordinate sergeant of Marines to death with a sword thrust. A court martial on 27 October found Gamage guilty of murder and sentenced him to hang. Appeals for clemency, including from the crew, were rejected and Gamage was hanged on 23 November from Griffons yardarm. As was customary, all vessels in the Downs sent two boats alongside Griffon to witness the execution; the men who remained on the vessels were required to watch from the decks of their vessels.

That December a report appeared in the press that Griffons crew had mutinied and sailed her to Boulogne. The petty officers, seamen, and marines of the crew wrote a letter to Trollope, subsequently published, affirming their satisfaction with him and their other officers.

In June 1814 Commander George Hewson replaced Trollope, who had been promoted to post captain on 7 June.

Post-war
Commander James A. Murray assumed command in May 1816.

On 20 September Lieutenant William Elliot Wright was appointed acting commander  at Saint Helena. On Griffons return to Britain Wright's appointment was confirmed on 20 August 1817. However, Wright then underwent a court martial for having smuggled 53 yards of crepe and other contraband while Griffon was at Portsmouth. The court ordered Wright dismissed the service. However, he was reinstated in 1819 without loss of rank.

In March 1819, the Commissioners of the Navy put Griffon up for sale at Deptford. They sold her to Hills & Co. for £1,700 on 11 March 1819.

Whaler
Lloyd's Register (LR) for 1819 showed a Griffon, French-built sloop, 9 [sic] years old, and 345 tons (bm), with owner Hills & Co.; later, the entry gave her burthen as 349 tons. This vessel continued in commercial service for Hills & Co. for some 27 years. The last year with an entry for this vessel was 1846, and that entry was without a trade route. A database on whaling shows that Griffin was a whaler and that she returned from her last voyage in 1850.

Notes, citations, and references
Notes

Citations 

References
 .
 
 
 
Fonds Marine. Campagnes (opérations; divisions et stations navales; missions diverses). Inventaire de la sous-série Marine BB4. Tome premier: BB210 à 482 (1805-1826) 

 
   
 

1806 ships
Brigs of the Royal Navy
Captured ships
Brigs of the French Navy
Whaling ships